Oladapo Joshua Afolayan (born 11 September 1997) is an English professional footballer who plays as a winger or centre-forward for 2. Bundesliga club FC St. Pauli.

He spent his youth at a multitude of clubs: Harrow St Marys, Chelsea, Toronto FC, Barnet, Tooting & Mitcham United and Toronto Varsity Blues. He left the Chelsea academy in order to concentrate on his GCSEs. He moved to Canada with his family but returned to England to study civil engineering at Loughborough University. He signed with Solihull Moors in February 2017 and scored 15 goals in 50 appearances, winning a move to Premier League club West Ham United 12 months later; he was also capped by the England C team. He spent the second half of the 2018–19 season on loan at Oldham Athletic and the first half of the 2019–20 campaign on loan at Mansfield Town.

Club career

Early career
Afolayan joined Harrow St Marys at under-5 level and moved into the youth system at Chelsea at the age of nine, having turned down the chance of a rival offer from Arsenal. He struggled with his short stature as a teenager and was restricted to playing as a winger. He left Chelsea at the age of 14 so that academy football did not get in the way of his schooling, at Merchant Taylors School.

At the age of 15, Afolayan moved to Canada and spent time in Toronto FC's reserve squad in League1 Ontario and the Premier Development League. He later said that despite being just 16 he "trained with the first team quite a bit and played with the likes of Jermain Defoe, Michael Bradley, Jozy Altidore and Sebastian Giovinco". Late in the 2015 season, he played for ANB Futbol in League1 Ontario. He also  played for the University of Toronto Varsity Blues, while in Canada.

Afolayan returned to England at the age of 18 to study a civil engineering degree at Loughborough University. He spent time playing youth football at Barnet and Tooting & Mitcham United. He went on to play for the Loughborough University football team whilst studying, scoring three goals in 11 appearances for the club in the Midland League.

Solihull Moors
On 7 February 2017, Afolayan signed for National League club Solihull Moors; he had previously been on trial at Rochdale. Four days after joining the Moors, Afolayan scored on his debut, scoring the final goal in a 3–0 win over Sutton United at Damson Park. He scored four goals in 15 games in the 2016–17 season and turned fully professional at the club in the summer, switching his engineering degree at Loughborough University for an online course. He also spent time at Jamie Vardy's V9 Academy. On 27 January 2018, Afolayan scored in his final game for the club, in a 3–1 win against Dagenham & Redbridge. Despite leaving the club half way through the campaign, he was Solihull's top-scorer for the entire 2017–18 season with 11 goals in 35 matches; Solihull ended the season in 18th place under the stewardship of Mark Yates.

West Ham United
On 1 February 2018, Afolayan signed a three-and-a-half year contract with Premier League club West Ham United. On 31 January 2019, he joined League Two side Oldham Athletic on loan until the end of the 2018–19 season. He made his Football League debut for the "Latics" in a 3–1 loss away to Bury on 23 February; he came onto the pitch as a 76th-minute substitute for Zak Dearnley. In total he made four starts and six substitute appearances during his time at Boundary Park and said he learned a lot form working under manager Paul Scholes.

He returned to League Two on a half-season loan with Mansfield Town on 29 August 2019. He scored his first Football League goal on 12 October, in a 6–1 win over former club Oldham Athletic at Field Mill; he also won a penalty in the game. Manager John Dempster "what impressed me was the distance he covered. He was pressing all over the pitch. He ran himself into the ground".

On 23 January 2021, Afolayan made his debut for West Ham, appearing as a substitute and scoring in a 4–0 FA Cup win against Doncaster Rovers.

Bolton Wanderers
Afolayan moved on loan to Bolton Wanderers on 1 February 2021. Bolton had the option to make the deal permanent at the end of his loan.

His debut came on 9 February, when he came on as a substitute for Lloyd Isgrove in a 1–1 draw against Morecambe. His first start came four days later in a 1–0 win against Stevenage. He scored his first goal for Bolton on the final day of the season, scoring Bolton's second goal in a 4–1 win against Crawley Town, the win confirming Bolton's promotion to League One.

On 27 May 2021, Afolayan signed a permanent three-year contract with Bolton, after Bolton activated the option clause in the loan agreement.

Afolayan started off the 2021–22 EFL League One campaign in excellent form, scoring six goals in the opening eleven games and was voted as Bolton's Player of the Month for both August and September 2021. He finished the season with 14 goals, making him Bolton's leading scorer, and he was voted as the club's Player of the Year for the 2021–22 season.

The 2022–2023 season saw Bolton change formation. In addition to that, as well as new signings playing well, his playing time became limited with Bolton trying to play him in various different positions to no avail. As a result, in January 2023, Afolayan was the subject of transfer bids from multiple clubs, with it being confirmed that Afolayan would leave the club and they would be able to cope without him.

FC St. Pauli
On 19 January 2023, Afolayan signed for 2. Bundesliga side FC St. Pauli after originally having three bids rejected by Bolton Wanderers, their fourth bid finally meeting Bolton's valuation. The fee was undisclosed, though The Bolton News reported it was around £500,000.

International career
Afolayan won a cap for Paul Fairclough's England C team on 8 November 2017, coming on as a 76th-minute substitute for Fejiri Okenabirhie in a 4–0 defeat to eventual International Challenge Trophy winners Slovakia U23.

In April 2021, Afolayan was asked in the Bolton Wanderers matchday programme if he would consider playing for Nigeria and he stated "Yeah I would. It's something I've thought about and hopefully I can keep playing well and get on their radar."

Style of play
Afolayan can play as a winger or centre-forward. West Ham Academy director Terry Westley said that he is an "interesting player" who is "aggressive, has great pace and the knack of scoring goal". Bolton Wanderers fans compared him to Jay-Jay Okocha due to the silky skills he produced whilst playing for them. Afolayan enjoyed these comparisons and after scoring against AFC Wimbledon did Okocha's signature goal celebration.

Career statistics

Honours
Individual
Bolton Wanderers Player of the Year: 2021–22

References

1997 births
Living people
Footballers from Harrow, London
English footballers
Association football wingers
Association football forwards
Chelsea F.C. players
Barnet F.C. players
Tooting & Mitcham United F.C. players
Toronto Varsity Blues soccer players
Loughborough University F.C. players
Solihull Moors F.C. players
West Ham United F.C. players
Oldham Athletic A.F.C. players
Mansfield Town F.C. players
National League (English football) players
English Football League players
Alumni of Loughborough University
Toronto FC players
ANB Futbol players
Bolton Wanderers F.C. players
FC St. Pauli players
England semi-pro international footballers
Black British sportspeople
English people of Nigerian descent
English expatriate footballers
Expatriate footballers in Germany
English expatriate sportspeople in Germany